Zoran Smileski (born 9 January 1950) is a Macedonian football coach and former player. His brothers Andreja and Branko also played for Partizan. who is current head coach  of United States soccer club Tyler in the sixth level soccer in the United States NPSL.

Career
Born in Skopje, North Macedonia, as a player he played for FK Borac Banja Luka and FK Partizan in the Yugoslav First League, with FC Wacker Tirol in the Austrian Bundesliga finishing his career by playing in a lower league club of Republika Srpska BSK Banja Luka.

Honours

Manager
Borac Banja Luka
Mitropa Cup: 1992
First League of the Republika Srpska: 2005–06

Sileks
North Macedonia First League: 1995–96, 1996–97,1997–98
North Macedonia Cup: 1996–97

Pobeda
North Macedonia Cup: 2001–02

Managerial statistics

References

1950 births
Living people
Footballers from Skopje
Association football midfielders
Yugoslav footballers
Macedonian footballers
FK Borac Banja Luka players
FK Partizan players
FC Wacker Innsbruck players
FK BSK Borča players
Yugoslav First League players
Austrian Football Bundesliga players
Yugoslav expatriate footballers
Yugoslav expatriate sportspeople in Austria
Expatriate footballers in Austria
Yugoslav football managers
Macedonian football managers
FK Borac Banja Luka managers
FK Shkëndija managers
FK Sileks managers
North Macedonia national under-21 football team managers
FK Pelister managers
FK Pobeda managers
PAS Giannina F.C. managers
KF Renova managers
Trikala F.C. managers
FK Teteks managers
Macedonian expatriate football managers
Expatriate football managers in Iraq
Expatriate football managers in Bosnia and Herzegovina
Macedonian expatriate sportspeople in Bosnia and Herzegovina
Expatriate football managers in Greece
Macedonian expatriate sportspeople in Greece
Expatriate football managers in Iran
Macedonian expatriate sportspeople in Iran
Expatriate soccer managers in the United States
Macedonian expatriate sportspeople in the United States